Pahasu is a town and a nagar panchayat in Bulandshahr district in the Indian state of Uttar Pradesh.

Geography
It has an average elevation of 187 metres (613 feet).

History
Pahasu was a jagir during British India owned by Nawabs  belonging to Lalkhani Muslim"Pahasu" is a large Muslim feudals of Aligarh (UP)."Pahasu" in British India was represented  by Old and young party in UP legislative council from years 1909 to 1919.

Nawabs of Pahasu
Nawab Sir Mohammed Faiz Ali Khan (1821–1894) of Pahasu
 Nawab Sir Mohammed Faiyaz Ali Khan (1851–1922)
 Nawab Mohammed Mukarram Ali Khan (1895–1969)

Demographics
 India census, Pahasu had a population of 17,116. Males constitute 53% of the population and females 47%. Pahasu has an average literacy rate of 48%, lower than the national average of 59.5%: male literacy is 57%, and female literacy is 38%. In Pahasu, 17% of the population is under 6 years of age.

References
Beauty of Pahasu

 Lodhi Rajputs are beauty of Pahasu. 
 Pahasu is the land of Lodhi Rajputs.
 Lodhi Nagar mohalla is an important part  of this beautiful place.
 There is a beautiful fort in pahasu. 
 It's an agricultural city.

 Pahasu is a most beautiful town.
Saraswati Vidya Mandir high school is a great school of culture and Indian civilization..
 Everyone should be teach their chind in SVM high school Pahasu.  
Genius public school is the good school in the small town like pahasu
 There is a most beautiful Durga Math Mandir.

[[Category:Cities and towns in
Bulandshahr district]]
Zamindari estates